One Night Steal (One Night Steal – ) is a 2019–2020 Thai television series starring Perawat Sangpotirat (Krist) and Sutatta Udomsilp (Punpun).

Directed by Kritsada Kanwichaphon and produced by GMMTV together with Parbdee Tawesuk, the series was one of the thirteen television series for 2019 launched by GMMTV during their "Wonder Th13teen" event on 5 November 2018. It premiered on GMM 25 and LINE TV on 24 November 2019, airing on Sundays at 20:10 ICT and 22:00 ICT, respectively. The series concluded on 9 February 2020.

Synopsis 
Jee (Sutatta Udomsilp) is a girl who has been showered with luck since her birth that even when a bread with jam falls, it doesn't fall on the side where the jam is. However, she is not that lucky when it comes to love. While working in a stock market prediction company, she meets Putti (Thanaboon Wanlopsirinun), a young business customer who is trying his best to get close to her.

Nott (Perawat Sangpotirat) is an aspiring musician who grew up to have met with several unlucky circumstances while growing up. In pursuit of his dream, he teamed up with Nueng (Purim Rattanaruangwattana) and GD (Harit Cheewagaroon) to form a band named "The Comet" under Mixx’s (Witawat Singlampong) music label company “Mixx Musix” but was disbanded abruptly after their first single failed to be a hit.

During a party to celebrate one of “Mixx Musix”’s company artist, Jee came together with her close friend and co-employee Bono (Ployshompoo Supasap) who was wanting to find out what her flirtatious boyfriend Mixx was doing while she was not around. Nott also happened to be at the same event to convince Mixx to give their band another chance. Jee stumbled upon Nott alone and both of them got to talk to each other until they got drunk and unknowingly got into a one night stand. This resulted into a change of their fortunes where Jee suddenly got into several problems while Nott, together with his band, became famous.

For Jee to regain her fortune, she needs to reconnect with Nott where she applied to become his band's manager.

Cast and characters 
Below are the cast of the series:

Main 
 Perawat Sangpotirat (Krist) as Nott
 Sutatta Udomsilp (Punpun) as Jee

Supporting 
 Purim Rattanaruangwattana (Pluem) as Nueng
 Harit Cheewagaroon (Sing) as GD
 Ployshompoo Supasap (Jan) as Bono
 Thanaboon Wanlopsirinun (Na) as Putti
 Suphitcha Subannaphong (Jomjam) as Charm
 Witawat Singlampong (Ball) as Mixx

Guest role 
 Thanat Lowkhunsombat (Lee) as Himself

Soundtracks

References

External links 
 One Night Steal on GMM 25 website 
 One Night Steal on LINE TV
 GMMTV

Television series by GMMTV
Thai romantic comedy television series
2019 Thai television series debuts
2020 Thai television series endings
GMM 25 original programming
Television series by Parbdee Taweesuk